The York Archaeological Trust for Excavation and Research Limited (YAT) is an educational charity, established in 1972 in the city of York, England. It carries out archaeological investigations, fieldwork, excavation and research in York, Yorkshire and throughout Britain and beyond. Its staff include specialists in archaeological excavation, historic building analysis and recording, artefact curation, conservation and research, archaeological computing, and illustration and design.

Commercial operations 

YAT primarily provides archaeological services to fulfil planning conditions, serving clients from private individuals to local authorities and commercial developers, as a company operating within the commercial archaeology sector.

In 2011, Trent and Peak Archaeology was taken over by YAT, allowing extension of their commercial archaeology operations to Nottingham. YAT also operated ArcHeritage providing archaeological services in Sheffield, and Northlight Heritage in Glasgow, a social enterprise promoting better use of heritage resources. In November 2021, the three archaeological services – York, Trent & Peak and ArcHeritage – were brought together under the York Archaeology brand.

Visitor attractions 

The Trust created and runs the Jorvik Viking Centre in Coppergate Walk, York, which is noted for its living history approach. The centre is on the site of the Trust's 'Viking Dig' which contributed to archaeologists' knowledge of town life in Viking Age England. Other sites in York run by the Jorvik Group are:
 Barley Hall, an excavated and reconstructed medieval house in Coffee Yard, off Stonegate
 DIG: an archaeological adventure in St Saviour's Church, St Saviourgate
 City Walls Experience at Micklegate Bar
From 2014, the Trust operated two small museums in gatehouses of York's city walls: the Richard III Experience at Monk Bar and the Henry VII Experience at Micklegate Bar. Both closed in 2020 at the onset of the COVID-19 pandemic, owing to their limited capacity for social distancing. In April 2022 
the Henry VII Experience was replaced by the City Walls Experience.
 
Since the 1980s, the Jorvik Viking Festival has been run by YAT each February half term.

Other operations 
The trust publishes printed and web-based reports, popular books and information resources. It offers opportunities to take part in archaeological investigation through its annual training excavation 'Archaeology Live', and hosts the Community Archaeologist for York.

References

Bibliography

External links
 

 
Organisations based in York
Charities based in North Yorkshire
1972 establishments in England